Calumet Township is an inactive township in Pike County, in the U.S. state of Missouri.

Calumet Township was erected in 1819, taking its name from Calumet Creek.

References

Townships in Missouri
Townships in Pike County, Missouri